The All-India Inter-University Cricket Championship held for the Rohinton Baria Gold Trophy (or simply, Rohinton Baria Trophy) is India's premier inter-university cricket tournament. It has been contested annually since the 1935/36 season.

History
The trophy was donated in 1935 by Ardeshir Dadabhoy Baria of Bombay in memory of his son Rohinton, for a tournament to be played between the Indian universities. Initially, the Board of Control for Cricket in India (BCCI)  organised the tournament, but the Inter-University Sports Board of India (IUSB) took over in 1940/41.

The university teams compete in zones before the winners and runners-up from each zone play off in semi-finals and finals. Until 1989/90, when the format was changed to a one-day 50-over contest, the finals were usually held over three or four days at the campus of one of the finalists or at a neutral venue. Sometimes matches were played to a finish regardless of time; the 1956-57 match went on for eight days and finished when Bombay University, having set Delhi University 728 to win, dismissed them for 611 in 304.1 overs.

Apart from Indian universities, Ceylon University also participated from 1947/48 to 1969/70. The only university from the future Pakistan to compete before Partition was the University of the Punjab in Lahore, which won the title four times.

In its early decades participation in the tournament helped prepare many future Test and first-class players, especially in the larger universities. In their team that won the 1940/41 final, Bombay University had four future Indian Test players (Ranga Sohoni, Hemu Adhikari, Chandra Sarwate and Sadu Shinde), while in their 1958/59 champion team they had five future Test players (Arvind Apte, Dilip Sardesai, Ajit Wadekar – who scored 324 in the final – Farokh Engineer and Ramakant Desai). In their 1945-46 team Punjab University included seven players (Nazar Mohammad, Imtiaz Ahmed, Maqsood Ahmed, Abdul Hafeez Kardar, Fazal Mahmood, Khan Mohammad and Shujauddin Butt) who later played a prominent part in Pakistan's Test successes in the 1950s. In the 1966-67 final Sunil Gavaskar played for Bombay University, in 1972-73 Mohinder Amarnath led Delhi University to victory, and Sanjay Manjrekar's six consecutive centuries for Bombay University propelled him into Bombay's Ranji Trophy team.

According to the writer and former Rohinton Baria Trophy and Ranji Trophy player Venkatraman Ramnarayan, the Rohinton Baria provided a valuable "finishing school" for future leaders, and a model of dignified behaviour on the sports field which is now lacking. With the rise of widespread junior competitions and coaching for young players, interest in inter-university cricket has waned in recent decades. According to Harsha Bhogle, who played for Osmania University, the growth of under-19 cricket destroyed university cricket.

Winners 

Notes:-
N/A means not applicable.
Before the 1977/78 season no matches were held for 3rd and 4th positions. 
For some of the tournaments between 1994/95 and 2005/06 the finalists and winners are obscure.
The Punjab University that competed before Partition is the University of the Punjab in Lahore, Pakistan, and the ones that have competed since Partition are the Panjab University, Chandigarh, and the Punjabi University, Patiala.

See also 

 Vizzy Trophy

References

External links
 Cricket Archive
 "When 'Varsity cricket reigned" by P.R. Man Singh

Indian domestic cricket competitions
Indian cricket in the 20th century